Nová Ves u Mladé Vožice is a municipality and village in Tábor District in the South Bohemian Region of the Czech Republic. It has about 200 inhabitants.

Administrative parts
Villages of Horní Střítež, Křtěnovice and Mutice are administrative parts of Nová Ves u Mladé Vožice.

Gallery

References

Villages in Tábor District